Josette is a 1938 American comedy film directed by Allan Dwan and starring Don Ameche, Simone Simon and Robert Young. Two brothers fall in love with the same nightclub singer.

Plot

Cast

References

Bibliography
 Tucker, David C. Joan Davis: America's Queen of Film, Radio and Television Comedy. McFarland, 2014.

External links
 

1938 films
1938 romantic comedy films
20th Century Fox films
American black-and-white films
American romantic comedy films
Films about singers
Films directed by Allan Dwan
Films scored by Walter Scharf
Films set in New Orleans
1930s English-language films
1930s American films